Pedro Javier Pavlov (born 24 August 2000) is an Argentine professional footballer who plays as a left-back for Al Dhafra in the UAE Pro League.

Career statistics

Club

Notes

References

External links

2000 births
Living people
Argentine footballers
Association football defenders
UAE Pro League players
Club Atlético River Plate footballers
Al Wahda FC players
Al Dhafra FC players
Argentine expatriate footballers
Expatriate footballers in the United Arab Emirates
Argentine expatriate sportspeople in the United Arab Emirates
People from Ushuaia